Trim weights may refer to:
Trim weights (diving) – Relatively small ballast weights worn by an underwater diver to adjust position of the centre of gravity while submerged
Trim weights (flying)